George Salisbury Chase (1909–1972) was an American composer for film and library music. He was born in Brooklyn, New York on October 23, 1909, to George S. and Florence E. (Reynolds) Chase. He is primarily known by his pseudonym “Michael Reynolds”.

In 1957, Chase was hired by R.T.F. Music Publishing Corp., a subsidiary of Thomas J. Valentino, Inc., to write background and production film music, and remained working there until his death. Chase composed under the pseudonym of Michael Reynolds for the firm's Major Record library. He was also known under the pseudonym "Franz Mahl".

Some of his compositions were used in episodes of the 1955–1956 seasons of Adventures of Superman. Four of them, "Dark of the Moon," "Mystic Night," "Hypertension," and "Vigil," were also tracked into Edward D. Wood Jr.'s "Plan 9 from Outer Space" (1956). He is also credited with composing the music for the 1952–4 television show Mr. and Mrs. North. Chase was a composer of liturgical music as well; the 1940 U.S. Census records his occupation as "musician, church."

He was an active member of Brooklyn Council of the Knights of Columbus.

Chase died on August 1, 1972, in Huntingdon, New York.

References

External links 
 

American male composers
American composers
Musicians from Brooklyn
1909 births
1972 deaths
20th-century American male musicians